Charles Wiggins may refer to:

 Charles E. Wiggins (1927–2000), U.S. Representative from California and U.S. federal judge
 Charles K. Wiggins, member of the Washington Supreme Court
 Charlie Wiggins, (Charles Edwin Wiggins) (1897–1979), American racing driver
 Charles Ray Wiggins (born 1966), American musician